Venkatagiri is a town  in Tirupati district of the Indian state of Andhra Pradesh. It is a municipality and mandals headquarters of Venkatagiri mandal. Venkatagiri's old name is "Kali Mili". It is famous for its Handloom Cotton Sarees. Venkatagiri is a place for history and handlooms. It was part of a small kingdom that was integrated into the Indian Republic.

History

Venkatagiri was originally known as Kalimilli till 17th century and was ruled by Gobburi Polygars under Vijaynagar Empire. They were defeated by Recherla Venkatadri Naidu, Nayak of Madurantakam and the nephew of Raja of Velugodu, another vassal under Venkatapathi Raya II of Aravidu dynasty of Vijayanagar. The village was renamed as Venkatagiri. By mid 17th century the Velogothi rulers shifted their capital to Venkatagiri and it lasted as a Zamindari till independence. It was located between two rivers, i.e., kaivalya river and godderu river.

Temples

Temples in Vekatagiri : Kashi Vishwanth Temple, Ramalingeswra Swami Temple, Prasanna Venkateswara Swami Temple, Poleramma Temple and Perumalla Swami Temple.

Geography
It has an average elevation of 60 metres (197 feet).

Demographics
 India census, Venkatagiri Mandal had a population of 200,000. Venkatagiri Rural consists of 58 Revenue Villages. Venkatagiri became municipality in 6-1-2005 by merging Venkatagiri, ChevireddiPalli, Periyavaram, Bangarupet, Ammavaripet and Manulalapet Panchayats.Total population of municipality is 52,478. Venkatagiri has an average literacy rate of 67%,higher than the national average of 59.5%. Total area of municipality is 23.50 km2.

Governance 

Economy

Venkatagiri Sari woven in and around the town is one of the geographical indication from Andhra Pradesh and got  registered by Geographical Indications of Goods (Registration and Protection) Act, 1999.

Politics

Venkatagiri falls under Venkatagiri (Assembly constituency) of Andhra Pradesh Legislative Assembly. It is in turn a part of Tirupati (Lok Sabha constituency). Neduramalli Janrdhan Reddy, Ex-CM of AP was represented as MLA from Venkatagiri AC from 1989 to 1994 & his wife Neduramalli RajayaLakshmi, Ex-Education minister of AP from 2004 to 2009, 2019 – till date Anam Ramnarayana Reddy of YSRCP Party.

Education
The primary and secondary school education is imparted by government, aided and private schools, under the School Education Department of the state. The medium of instruction followed by different schools are English, Telugu. AP Residential School, RVM High School, RVRKY ZP Girls High School, AP Residential Junior College, IIHT, Visvodaya govt college and ESS Degree colleges are very old institutes in Venkatagiri Town. There is also a Central government school in venkatagiri, Kendriya Vidhyalaya.

Transport
Venkatagiri railway station is located on Gudur–Katpadi branch line. APSRTC buses, run by state government provide transport to the nearby and long-distance travel.

References

External links

Towns in Tirupati district